Salvador "Dado" Marino (1915-1989) was a flyweight boxer from Honolulu, Hawaii, who became World flyweight champion in 1950. He also boxed as a bantamweight, and unsuccessfully fought for the World bantamweight title.

Professional career
He made his professional debut in June 1941, in Honolulu, where he was to fight the majority of his bouts. He defeated Paul Francis by a knockout in the second round.

He fought his first forty bouts in Honolulu, before travelling to Glasgow, in Scotland in July 1947, for a title fight against Jackie Paterson, the World flyweight champion. Unfortunately, Paterson was unable to make the weight, and indeed collapsed at the weigh-in. The result was that Paterson was stripped of his World title, and a non-title fight was arranged between Marino and Rinty Monaghan of Northern Ireland. Marino won the bout when Monaghan was disqualified in the ninth round.

A month later Marino fought Peter Kane, the previous holder of the World flyweight title, before Paterson. The fight was held in Manchester and Kane won on points over ten rounds.

In October 1947, Marino and Rinty Monaghan met at Harringay Arena, London for the vacant World flyweight title, previously held by Jackie Paterson. The title fight was recognised by the National Boxing Association but not the British Boxing Board of Control. Monaghan won on points over fifteen rounds to take the title.

Dado then returned to the US, and continued his career.

In March 1949, the legendary World bantamweight champion, American Manuel Ortiz, came to Honolulu to defend his title against Marino. Marino again lost out when Ortiz won a unanimous points decision.

World title
In August 1950, Terry Allen, the English holder of the World flyweight title, came to Honolulu to defend his title against Marino. Marino became World champion when he won a unanimous points decision.

In November 1951, Allen returned for a re-match in Honolulu, but Marino retained the title with another unanimous decision.

In his next fight, a non-title fight, Marino was stopped in seven rounds, in Honolulu, by Yoshio Shirai, of Japan. Marino was down six times before his manager leapt through the ropes to halt the fight.

Despite this defeat, Marino agreed to defend his title against Shirai in May 1952. The title fight was in Tokyo, Japan, in front of 40,00 spectators. Shirai took Marino's title with a unanimous points decision.

In November 1952, Marino tried to regain the title in a re-match with Shiriai, again in Tokyo, but the Japanese won another unanimous decision. This was Marino's last fight.

Professional boxing record

See also
 List of flyweight boxing champions

References

 Maurice Golesworthy, Encyclopaedia of Boxing (Eighth Edition) (1988), Robert Hale Limited,

External links

 
 Dado Marino - CBZ Profile

1915 births
1989 deaths
Boxers from Hawaii
Filipino male boxers
Flyweight boxers
Sportspeople from Honolulu
World boxing champions
American male boxers